The 2002 CSKA season was the club's eleventh season in the Russian Premier League, the highest tier of association football in Russia.

Squad

Transfers

Winter

In:

Out:

Summer

In:

Out:

Competitions

Premier League

Results by round

Results

Table

Championship playoff

Russian Cup

2001–02

2002–03

UEFA Cup

Squad Statistics

Appearances and goals

|-
|colspan="14"|Players out on loan:

|-
|colspan="14"|Players who left CSKA Moscow during the season:

|}

Goal scorers

Disciplinary Record

References

PFC CSKA Moscow seasons
CSKA Moscow